Tendayi Jembere aka TJ, Tee J is a British actor who is best known for his part in the 2003 television show Kerching!, where he played the character of Seymour, the best friend of lead character Taj Lewis.

Biography
He grew up in East London. Tendayi Jembere's first television part was in the CBBC hit sitcom Kerching! where he played the main character's best friend, Seymour a cooking expert and also the junior partner of the successful company RudeBoy. He owned 1% of Rudeboy's takings which were in the thousands by that period of time in the show's history. Kerching has so far run for more than four series and has been repeated heavily after six on the CBBC Channel. It repeated all of the series straight after each other and made Kerching even more successful.

Kerching 
Fourteen-year-old Taj Lewis is a bright lad hoping to make his family a million pounds, and to this end has launched a website under the name 'rude boy'. His family and pals are (as described in the credit sequence) Seymour and Danny, his best friends; Missy, his big sister; Kareesha, her best friend; Ricardo, Taj's rival; and Tasmin, Ricardo's girlfriend. Completing the main line-up are Taj's little brother Omar and their single mum, who works as a nurse. (Taj's father has died.) Missy and Kareesha work in the Chill Out Grill where Taj and his friends hang out and hatch their get-rich-quick schemes, some of which actually work.
Tendayi Jembere next appeared in  Mr Harvey Lights a Candle (2005), a TV series where he played the character of Sid Williams.

Career highlights
2007 - Micheal Baxter in The Bill

2007 - Tendayi Jembere is recently in a popular viewer vote television show on MTV Base, MTV One, Channel 4, 4+1, and E4 called Dubplate Drama, where the viewers decide what happens next through voting online or text via mobile phone.(he plays a character called "Minus")

2011 - Jembere appears as Chuggs in Mogadishu by Vivienne Franzmann at the Royal Exchange in Manchester then at the Lyric Theatre in London

External links 

Kerching info

English male television actors
English people of Zimbabwean descent
Black British male actors
Living people
Year of birth missing (living people)